Ra is a consonant of Indic abugidas. In modern Indic scripts, Ra is derived from the early "Ashoka" Brahmi letter  after having gone through the Gupta letter . Most Indic scripts have differing forms of Ra when used in combination with other consonants, including subjoined and repha forms. Some of these are encoded in computer text as separate characters, while others are generated dynamically using conjunct shaping with a virama.

Āryabhaṭa numeration

Aryabhata used Devanagari letters for numbers, very similar to the Greek numerals, even after the invention of Indian numerals. The values of the different forms of र are: 
र  = 40 (४०)
रि  = 4,000 (४ ०००)
रु  = 400,000 (४ ०० ०००)
रृ  = 40,000,000 (४ ०० ०० ०००)
रॢ  = 4 (४×१०९)
रे  = 4 (४×१०११)
रै  = 4 (४×१०१३)
रो  = 4 (४×१०१५)
रौ  = 4 (४×१०१७)

Historic Ra
There are three different general early historic scripts - Brahmi and its variants, Kharoṣṭhī, and Tocharian, the so-called slanting Brahmi. Ra as found in standard Brahmi, was a simple geometric shape, with variations toward more flowing forms by the Gupta . The Tocharian Ra  had an alternate Fremdzeichen form, . The third form of ra, in Kharoshthi, was probably derived from Aramaic separately from the Brahmi letter.

Brahmi Ra
The Brahmi letter , Ra, is probably derived from the Aramaic Resh , and is thus related to the modern Latin R and Greek Rho. Several identifiable styles of writing the Brahmi Ra can be found, most associated with a specific set of inscriptions from an artifact or diverse records from an historic period. As the earliest and most geometric style of Brahmi, the letters found on the Edicts of Ashoka and other records from around that time are normally the reference form for Brahmi letters, with vowel marks not attested until later forms of Brahmi back-formed to match the geometric writing style.

Tocharian Ra
The Tocharian letter  is derived from the Brahmi , and has an alternate Fremdzeichen form  used in conjuncts and as an alternate representation of Rä. The use of repha forms in modern Indic scripts is similar to the Fremdzeichen Ra in Tocharian.

Kharoṣṭhī Ra
The Kharoṣṭhī letter  is generally accepted as being derived from the Aramaic Resh , and is thus related to R and Rho, in addition to the Brahmi Ra.

Devanagari Ra

Ra (र) is a consonant of the Devanagari abugida. It ultimately arose from the Brahmi letter , after having gone through the Gupta letter . Letters that derive from it are the Gujarati letter ર, and the Modi letter 𑘨. Ra, along with the Latin capital letter R, is the basis of the currency symbol ₹, which represents the Indian rupee.

Devanagari-using languages
Like all Indic scripts, Devanagari uses vowel marks attached to the base consonant to override the inherent /ə/ vowel:

Several languages use the dotted form Rra  for the [r] sound instead of र. ऱ combines with vowel marks identically to र.

Conjuncts with र

Devanagari exhibits conjunct ligatures, as is common in Indic scripts. In modern Devanagari texts, most conjuncts are formed by reducing the letter shape to fit tightly to the following letter, usually by dropping a character's vertical stem, sometimes referred to as a "half form". Some conjunct clusters are always represented by a true ligature, instead of a shape that can be broken into constituent independent letters. Vertically stacked conjuncts are ubiquitous in older texts, while only a few are still used routinely in modern Devanagari texts. The use of ligatures and vertical conjuncts may vary across languages using the Devanagari, with Marathi in particular preferring the use of half forms where texts in other languages would show ligatures and vertical stacks.

When in conjuncts with other letters, र takes on several different forms, the most important of which are Repha and Rakar.
Repha is used to indicate that a conjunct begins with "R". It is crescent shape attached atop the headline of the rest of the conjunct at the right, immediately above the vertical stem, if present. The other members of the conjunct ignore Repha for shaping, combining with the other members of the conjunct to form ligatures or stacked conjuncts normally.

Rakar is used to indicate a consonant conjunct ending in "Ra". It is an upward-pointing wedge shape that is found either centered below the rest of the conjunct, or tilted to the right and integrated with the bottom of the stemline. Like with Repha, the rest of the conjunct ignores Rakar for shaping, except for minor alteration of the bottom of any stemline.

The third conjunct form of Ra is the so-called Eyelash Ra. It resembles a half-form in retaining the head line, with a shape below that connects to the following letter, but this remaining eyelash shape does not resemble either र or ऱ. The eyelash Ra is used in Nepali and Marathi texts instead of Repha for an initial "R" sound in a conjunct. Even though those languages both use the dotted Ra ऱ, eyelash Ra is the default form of Ra + Virama in Unicode for backwards compatibility, and the Repha form is mapped individually as a ligature with each other Devanagari consonant.

Devanagari Repha
 Repha र্ (r) + ब (ba) gives the ligature rba: 

 Repha र্ (r) + भ (bha) gives the ligature rbha:

 Repha र্ (r) + च (ca) gives the ligature rca:

 Repha र্ (r) + छ (cha) gives the ligature rcha:

 Repha र্ (r) + द (da) gives the ligature rda:

 Repha र্ (r) + ड (ḍa) gives the ligature rḍa:

 Repha र্ (r) + ढ (ḍʱa) gives the ligature rḍʱa:

 Repha र্ (r) + द্ (d) + ध (dʱa) gives the ligature rddʱa:

 Repha र্ (r) + ध (dʱa) gives the ligature rdʱa:

 Repha र্ (r) + द্ (d) + व (va) gives the ligature rdva:

 Repha र্ (r) + ग (ga) gives the ligature rga:

 Repha र্ (r) + घ (ɡʱa) gives the ligature rɡʱa:

 Repha र্ (r) + ह (ha) gives the ligature rha:

 Repha र্ (r) + ज (ja) gives the ligature rja:

 Repha र্ (r) + झ (jha) gives the ligature rjha:

 Repha र্ (r) + ज্ (j) + ञ (ña) gives the ligature rjña:

 Repha र্ (r) + क (ka) gives the ligature rka:

 Repha र্ (r) + ख (kha) gives the ligature rkha:

 Repha र্ (r) + क্ (k) + ष (ṣa) gives the ligature rkṣa:

 Repha र্ (r) + ल (la) gives the ligature rla:

 Repha र্ (r) + ळ (ḷa) gives the ligature rḷa:

 Repha र্ (r) + म (ma) gives the ligature rma:

 Repha र্ (r) + न (na) gives the ligature rna:

 Repha र্ (r) + ङ (ŋa) gives the ligature rŋa:

 Repha र্ (r) + ङ্ (ŋ) + ग (ga) gives the ligature rŋga:

 Repha र্ (r) + ण (ṇa) gives the ligature rṇa:

 Repha र্ (r) + ञ (ña) gives the ligature rña:

 Repha र্ (r) + प (pa) gives the ligature rpa:

 Repha र্ (r) + फ (pha) gives the ligature rpha:

 Repha र্ (r) + र (ra) gives the ligature rra:

 Repha र্ (r) + स (sa) gives the ligature rsa:

 Repha र্ (r) + श (ʃa) gives the ligature rʃa:

 Repha र্ (r) + ष (ṣa) gives the ligature rṣa:

 Repha र্ (r) + स্ (s) + व (va) gives the ligature rsva:

 Repha र্ (r) + त (ta) gives the ligature rta:

 Repha र্ (r) + थ (tha) gives the ligature rtha:

 Repha र্ (r) + ट (ṭa) gives the ligature rṭa:

 Repha र্ (r) + त্ (t) + त (ta) gives the ligature rtta:

 Repha र্ (r) + ठ (ṭha) gives the ligature rṭha:

 Repha र্ (r) + व (va) gives the ligature rva:

 Repha र্ (r) + य (ya) gives the ligature rya:

Devanagari Rakar
 भ্ (bh) + र (ra) gives the ligature bhra:

 ब্ (b) + र (ra) gives the ligature bra:

 छ্ (ch) + र (ra) gives the ligature chra:

 च্ (c) + र (ra) gives the ligature cra:

 द্ (d) + ब্ (b) + र (ra) gives the ligature dbra:

 ढ্ (ḍʱ) + र (ra) gives the ligature ḍʱra:

 ड্ (ḍ) + र (ra) gives the ligature ḍra:

 द্ (d) + द্ (d) + र (ra) gives the ligature ddra:

 द্ (d) + ग্ (g) + र (ra) gives the ligature dgra:

 ध্ (dʱ) + र (ra) gives the ligature dʱra:

 द্ (d) + र (ra) gives the ligature dra:

 घ্ (ɡʱ) + र (ra) gives the ligature ɡʱra:

 ग্ (g) + र (ra) gives the ligature gra:

 ग্ (g) + र্ (r) + य (ya) gives the ligature grya:

 ह্ (h) + र (ra) gives the ligature hra:

 झ্ (jh) + र (ra) gives the ligature jhra:

 ज্ (j) + र (ra) gives the ligature jra:

 क্ (k) + र (ra) gives the ligature kra:

 क্ (k) + त্ (t) + र (ra) gives the ligature ktra:

 ळ্ (ḷ) + र (ra) gives the ligature ḷra:

 ल্ (l) + र (ra) gives the ligature lra:

 म্ (m) + र (ra) gives the ligature mra:

 ङ্ (ŋ) + क্ (k) + र (ra) gives the ligature ŋkra:

 ङ্ (ŋ) + र (ra) gives the ligature ŋra:

 ण্ (ṇ) + र (ra) gives the ligature ṇra:

 न্ (n) + र (ra) gives the ligature nra:

 ञ্ (ñ) + र (ra) gives the ligature ñra:

 फ্ (ph) + र (ra) gives the ligature phra:

 प্ (p) + र (ra) gives the ligature pra:

 प্ (p) + त্ (t) + र (ra) gives the ligature ptra:

 श্ (ʃ) + र (ra) gives the ligature ʃra:

 स্ (s) + र (ra) gives the ligature sra:

 ष্ (ṣ) + क্ (k) + र (ra) gives the ligature ṣkra:

 ष্ (ṣ) + र (ra) gives the ligature ṣra:

 थ্ (th) + र (ra) gives the ligature thra:

 त্ (t) + र (ra) gives the ligature tra:

 त্ (t) + र্ (r) + य (ya) gives the ligature trya:

 ठ্ (ṭh) + र (ra) gives the ligature ṭhra:

 ट্ (ṭ) + र (ra) gives the ligature ṭra:

 त্ (t) + त্ (t) + र (ra) gives the ligature ttra:

 व্ (v) + र (ra) gives the ligature vra:

 य্ (y) + र (ra) gives the ligature yra:

Conjuncts with both Repha and Rakar forms
 र্ (r) + ध্ (dʱ) + र (ra) gives the ligature rdʱra:

 र্ (r) + ष্ (ṣ) + ट্ (ṭ) + र (ra) gives the ligature rṣṭra:

 र্ (r) + त্ (t) + र (ra) gives the ligature rtra:

 र্ (r) + त্ (t) + त্ (t) + र (ra) gives the ligature rttra:

Devanagari Eyelash Ra
 Eyelash र্ (r) + ब (ba) gives the ligature rba:

 Eyelash र্ (r) + भ (bha) gives the ligature rbha:

 Eyelash र্ (r) + च (ca) gives the ligature rca:

 Eyelash र্ (r) + छ (cha) gives the ligature rcha:

 Eyelash र্ (r) + द (da) gives the ligature rda:

 Eyelash र্ (r) + ड (ḍa) gives the ligature rḍa:

 Eyelash र্ (r) + ढ (ḍʱa) gives the ligature rḍʱa:

 Eyelash र্ (r) + ध (dʱa) gives the ligature rdʱa:

 Eyelash र্ (r) + ग (ga) gives the ligature rga:

 Eyelash र্ (r) + घ (ɡʱa) gives the ligature rɡʱa:

 Eyelash र্ (r) + ह (ha) gives the ligature rha:

 Eyelash र্ (r) + ज (ja) gives the ligature rja:

 Eyelash र্ (r) + झ (jha) gives the ligature rjha:

 Eyelash र্ (r) + ज্ (j) + ञ (ña) gives the ligature rjña:

 Eyelash र্ (r) + क (ka) gives the ligature rka:

 Eyelash र্ (r) + ख (kha) gives the ligature rkha:

 Eyelash र্ (r) + क্ (k) + ष (ṣa) gives the ligature rkṣa:

 Eyelash र্ (r) + ल (la) gives the ligature rla:

 Eyelash र্ (r) + ळ (ḷa) gives the ligature rḷa:

 Eyelash र্ (r) + म (ma) gives the ligature rma:

 Eyelash र্ (r) + न (na) gives the ligature rna:

 Eyelash र্ (r) + ङ (ŋa) gives the ligature rŋa:

 Eyelash र্ (r) + ण (ṇa) gives the ligature rṇa:

 Eyelash र্ (r) + ञ (ña) gives the ligature rña:

 Eyelash र্ (r) + प (pa) gives the ligature rpa:

 Eyelash र্ (r) + फ (pha) gives the ligature rpha:

 Eyelash र্ (r) + स (sa) gives the ligature rsa:

 Eyelash र্ (r) + श (ʃa) gives the ligature rʃa:

 Eyelash र্ (r) + ष (ṣa) gives the ligature rṣa:

 Eyelash र্ (r) + त (ta) gives the ligature rta:

 Eyelash र্ (r) + थ (tha) gives the ligature rtha:

 Eyelash र্ (r) + ट (ṭa) gives the ligature rṭa:

 Eyelash र্ (r) + ठ (ṭha) gives the ligature rṭha:

 Eyelash र্ (r) + व (va) gives the ligature rva:

 Eyelash र্ (r) + य (ya) gives the ligature rya:

Bengali-Assamese Ra
The Bengali-Assamese script র and ৰ are derived from the Siddhaṃ , and are marked by a similar horizontal head line, but less geometric shape, than their Devanagari counterpart, र. The inherent vowel of Bengali and Assamese consonant letters is /ɔ/, so the bare letter র/ৰ will sometimes be transliterated as "ro" instead of "ra". Adding okar, the "o" vowel mark, gives a reading of /ro/.
Like all Indic consonants, র/ৰ can be modified by marks to indicate another (or no) vowel than its inherent "a".

র/ৰ in Bengali-Assamese using languages
র or ৰ is used as a basic consonant character in many of the Bengali-Assamese script orthographies, including Bengali and Assamese. Bengali uses র and Assamese uses ৰ. In Assamese র was used for va but now standardised as ৱ.

Conjuncts with র/ৰ
Bengali-Assamese র/ৰ exhibits conjunct ligatures, as is common in Indic scripts. Much like other Indic scripts, Bengali-Assamese র/ৰ also rarely appears in conjuncts in full form, and has special unrelated graphic forms for both initial and trailing র/ৰ in conjuncts called Repha and Ra phala (in Bengali) or Ra kar (in Assamese).

Bengali-Assamese  Ra-phala/kar

The letter র/ৰ has a special form when used as the last letter of a conjunct called "Ra phala/kar" (or "Ro pholo"). This reduced form of র/ৰ is appended to the bottom of a letter or conjunct. Both Ya and Va have a similar "phala" trailing form. Ra-phala and Ya-phala can be found together in many conjuncts.
 ভ্ (bh) + র/ৰ (ra) gives the ligature bhra:

 ব্ (b) + র/ৰ (ra) gives the ligature bra:

 চ্ (c) + ছ্ (ch) + র/ৰ (ra) gives the ligature cchra:

 দ্ (d) + ভ্ (bh) + র/ৰ (ra) gives the ligature dbhra:

 ঢ্ (ḍʱ) + র/ৰ (ra) gives the ligature ḍʱra:

 ড্ (ḍ) + র/ৰ (ra) gives the ligature ḍra:

 ধ্ (dʱ) + র/ৰ (ra) gives the ligature dʱra:

 দ্ (d) + র/ৰ (ra) gives the ligature dra:

 দ্ (d) + র্/ৰ্ (r) + য (ya) gives the ligature drya, with the ya phala suffix in addition to ra phala:

 গ্ (g) + ধ্ (dʱ) + র/ৰ (ra) gives the ligature gdʱra:

 ঘ্ (ɡʱ) + র/ৰ (ra) gives the ligature ɡʱra:

 গ্ (g) + র/ৰ (ra) gives the ligature gra:

 গ্ (g) + র্/ৰ (r) + য (ya) gives the ligature grya, with the ya phala suffix in addition to ra phala:

 জ্ (j) + র/ৰ (ra) gives the ligature jra:

 খ্ (kh) + র/ৰ (ra) gives the ligature khra:

 ক্ (k) + র/ৰ (ra) gives the ligature kra:

 ক্ (k) + ত্ (t) + র/ৰ (ra) gives the ligature ktra:

 ক্ (k) + ট্ (ṭ) + র/ৰ (ra) gives the ligature kṭra:

 ম্ (m) + ভ্ (bh) + র/ৰ (ra) gives the ligature mbhra:

 ম্ (m) + প্ (p) + র/ৰ (ra) gives the ligature mpra:

 ম্ (m) + র/ৰ (ra) gives the ligature mra:

 ম্ (m) + ব্ (v) + র/ৰ (ra) gives the ligature mvra:

 ন্ (n) + ড্ (ḍ) + র/ৰ (ra) gives the ligature nḍra:

 ন্ (n) + ধ্ (dʱ) + র/ৰ (ra) gives the ligature ndʱra:

 ন্ (n) + দ্ (d) + র/ৰ (ra) gives the ligature ndra:

 ঙ্ (ŋ) + ঘ্ (ɡʱ) + র/ৰ (ra) gives the ligature ŋɡʱra:

 ঙ্ (ŋ) + ক্ (k) + র/ৰ (ra) gives the ligature ŋkra:

 ণ্ (ṇ) + ড্ (ḍ) + র/ৰ (ra) gives the ligature ṇḍra:

 ন্ (n) + থ্ (th) + র/ৰ (ra) gives the ligature nthra:

 ন্ (n) + ত্ (t) + র/ৰ (ra) gives the ligature ntra:

 ন্ (n) + ত্ (t) + র্/ৰ্ (r) + য (ya) gives the ligature ntrya, with the ya phala suffix in addition to ra phala:

 ন্ (n) + ট্ (ṭ) + র/ৰ (ra) gives the ligature nṭra:

 ফ্ (ph) + র/ৰ (ra) gives the ligature phra:

 প্ (p) + র/ৰ (ra) gives the ligature pra:

 প্ (p) + র্/ৰ (r) + য (ya) gives the ligature prya, with the ya phala suffix in addition to ra phala:

 শ্ (ʃ) + র/ৰ (ra) gives the ligature ʃra:

 স্ (s) + ক্ (k) + র/ৰ (ra) gives the ligature skra:

 স্ (s) + র/ৰ (ra) gives the ligature sra:

 ষ্ (ṣ) + ক্ (k) + র/ৰ (ra) gives the ligature ṣkra:

 ষ্ (ṣ) + প্ (p) + র/ৰ (ra) gives the ligature ṣpra:

 ষ্ (ṣ) + ট্ (ṭ) + র/ৰ (ra) gives the ligature ṣṭra:

 স্ (s) + ত্ (t) + র/ৰ (ra) gives the ligature stra:

 স্ (s) + ট্ (ṭ) + র/ৰ (ra) gives the ligature sṭra:

 থ্ (th) + র/ৰ (ra) gives the ligature thra:

 ত্ (t) + র/ৰ (ra) gives the ligature tra:

 ত্ (t) + র্/ৰ (r) + য (ya) gives the ligature trya, with the ya phala suffix in addition to ra phala:

 ট্ (ṭ) + র/ৰ (ra) gives the ligature ṭra:

Bengali-Assamese Repha

Unlike other letters, র/ৰ also has a special form when used as the initial letter of a conjunct called "Repha". This reduced form of র on top of the following letter or conjunct. Repha can be found in combination with Ra-phala, Ya-phala/kar and Va-phala/kar in many conjuncts.
 র্ (r) + ভ (bha) gives the ligature rbha:

 র্ (r) + ব্ (b) + য (ya) gives the ligature rbya, with the ya phala suffix:

 র্ (r) + চ (ca) gives the ligature rca:

 র্ (r) + ছ (cha) gives the ligature rcha:

 র্ (r) + চ্ (c) + য (ya) gives the ligature rcya, with the ya phala suffix in addition to repha:

 র্ (r) + দ (da) gives the ligature rda:

 র্ (r) + ড (ḍa) gives the ligature rḍa:

 র্ (r) + ঢ্ (ḍʱ) + য (ya) gives the ligature rḍʱya, with the ya phala suffix in addition to repha:

 র্ (r) + ধ (dʱa) gives the ligature rdʱa:

 র্ (r) + ধ্ (dʱ) + ব (va) gives the ligature rdʱva, with the va phala suffix in addition to repha:

 র্ (r) + দ্ (d) + র (ra) gives the ligature rdra:

 র্ (r) + দ্ (d) + ব (va) gives the ligature rdva, with the va phala suffix in addition to repha:

 র্ (r) + গ (ga) gives the ligature rga:

 র্ (r) + ঘ (ɡʱa) gives the ligature rɡʱa:

 র্ (r) +  (ɡʱ) + য (ya) gives the ligature rɡʱya, with the ya phala suffix in addition to repha:

 র্ (r) + গ্ (ga) + য (ya) gives the ligature rɡya, with the ya phala suffix in addition to repha:

 র্ (r) + হ (ha) gives the ligature rha:

 র্ (r) + হ্ (h) + য (ya) gives the ligature rhya, with the ya phala suffix in addition to repha:

 র্ (r) + জ (ja) gives the ligature rja:

 র্ (r) + ঝ (jha) gives the ligature rjha:

 র্ (r) + জ্ (j) + য (ya) gives the ligature rjya, with the ya phala suffix in addition to repha:

 র্ (r) + ক (ka) gives the ligature rka:

 র্ (r) + খ (kha) gives the ligature rkha:

 র্ (r) + খ্ (kh) + য (ya) gives the ligature rkhya, with the ya phala suffix in addition to repha:

 র্ (r) + ক্ (k) + য (ya) gives the ligature rkya, with the ya phala suffix in addition to repha:

 র্ (r) + ল (la) gives the ligature rla:

 র্ (r) + ম (ma) gives the ligature rma:

 র্ (r) + ম্ (m) + য (ya) gives the ligature rmya, with the ya phala suffix in addition to repha:

 র্ (r) + ন (na) gives the ligature rna:

 র্ (r) + ণ (ṇa) gives the ligature rṇa:

 র্ (r) + ণ্ (ṇ) + য (ya) gives the ligature rṇya, with the ya phala suffix in addition to repha:

 র্ (r) + প (pa) gives the ligature rpa:

 র্ (r) + ফ (pha) gives the ligature rpha:

 র্ (r) + স (sa) gives the ligature rsa:

 র্ (r) + শ (ʃa) gives the ligature rʃa:

 র্ (r) + শ্ (ʃ) + ব (va) gives the ligature rʃva, with the va phala suffix in addition to repha:

 র্ (r) + শ্ (ʃ) + য (ya) gives the ligature rʃya, with the ya phala suffix in addition to repha:

 র্ (r) + ষ (ṣa) gives the ligature rṣa:

 র্ (r) + ষ্ (ṣ) + য (ya) gives the ligature rṣya, with the ya phala suffix in addition to repha:

 র্ (r) + ত (ta) gives the ligature rta:

 র্ (r) + থ (tha) gives the ligature rtha:

 র্ (r) + থ্ (th) + য (ya) gives the ligature rthya, with the ya phala suffix in addition to repha:

 র্ (r) + ত্ (t) + র (ra) gives the ligature rtra:

 র্ (r) + ট (ṭa) gives the ligature rṭa:

 র্ (r) + ত্ (t) + য (ya) gives the ligature rtya, with the ya phala suffix in addition to repha:

 র্ (r) + য (ya) gives the ligature rya, with repha, not ya phala:

Gujarati Ra

Ra (ર) is twenty-seventh consonant of the Gujarati abugida. It is derived from the Devanagari Ra  with the top bar (shiro rekha) removed, and ultimately the Brahmi letter . When combined with certain vowels, the Gujarati Ra may assume unique forms, such as રુ and રૂ.

Gujarati-using Languages
The Gujarati script is used to write the Gujarati and Kutchi languages. Like all Indic scripts, Gujarati uses vowel marks attached to the base consonant to override the inherent /ə/ vowel:

Conjuncts with ર

Gujarati ર exhibits conjunct ligatures, much like its parent Devanagari Script. While most Gujarati conjuncts can only be formed by reducing the letter shape to create a "half form" that fits tightly to following letter, Ra does not have a half form. A few conjunct clusters can be represented by a true ligature, instead of a shape that can be broken into constituent independent letters, and vertically stacked conjuncts can also be found in Gujarati, although much less commonly than in Devanagari.
True ligatures are quite rare in Indic scripts. The most common ligated conjuncts in Gujarati are in the form of a slight mutation to fit in context or as a consistent variant form appended to the adjacent characters. The most common conjunct variants are the Repha and Rakar forms of Ra. A leading consonant or conjunct will use its full form, rather than half form, when being modified by a trailing Rakar.

Javanese Ra

Telugu Ra

Ra (ర) is a consonant of the Telugu abugida. It ultimately arose from the Brahmi letter . It is closely related to the Kannada letter ರ. Most Telugu consonants contain a v-shaped headstroke that is related to the horizontal headline found in other Indic scripts, although headstrokes do not connect adjacent letters in Telugu. The headstroke is normally lost when adding vowel matras.
Telugu conjuncts are created by reducing trailing letters to a subjoined form that appears below the initial consonant of the conjunct. Like the Rakar forms in other Indic scripts, the subjoined Ra in Telugu is not immediately related to the full form of Ra. Unlike other the Repha in other Indic scripts, there is no special prefix form of Ra in Telugu. Ligature conjuncts are not a feature in Telugu, with the only non-standard construction being an alternate subjoined form of Ṣa (borrowed from Kannada) in the KṢa conjunct.

Telugu Rra

In addition, Telugu also contains a second /r/ consonant, Rra (ఱ). It is closely related to the Kannada letter ಱ. Since it lacks the v-shaped headstroke common to most Telugu letters, ఱ remains unaltered by most vowel matras, and its subjoined form is simply a smaller version of the normal letter shape.

Malayalam Ra

Ra (ര) is a consonant of the Malayalam abugida. It ultimately arose from the Brahmi letter , via the Grantha letter  Ra. Like in other Indic scripts, Malayalam consonants have the inherent vowel "a", and take one of several modifying vowel signs to represent syllables with another vowel or no vowel at all.

Conjuncts of ര 

As is common in Indic scripts, Malayalam joins letters together to form conjunct consonant clusters. There are several ways in which conjuncts are formed in Malayalam texts: using a post-base form of a trailing consonant placed under the initial consonant of a conjunct, a combined ligature of two or more consonants joined together, a conjoining form that appears as a combining mark on the rest of the conjunct, the use of an explicit candrakkala mark to suppress the inherent "a" vowel, or a special consonant form called a "chillu" letter, representing a bare consonant without the inherent "a" vowel. Like in most Indic scripts, Malayalam Ra has special forms, including a chillu letter and a conjoining form for a trailing ra, which appears before the other elements of a conjunct but is pronounced after. Texts written with the modern reformed Malayalam orthography, put̪iya lipi, may favor more regular conjunct forms than older texts in paḻaya lipi, due to changes undertaken in the 1970s by the Government of Kerala.
 ക് (k) +  ര (ra)  gives the ligature kra:

 ഖ് (kh) +  ര (ra)  gives the ligature khra:

 ഗ് (g) +  ര (ra)  gives the ligature gra:

 ഘ് (ɡʱ) +  ര (ra)  gives the ligature ɡʱra:

Malayalam Ṟa

Ṟa (റ) is a consonant of the Malayalam abugida. It is related to the Malayalam Ra consonant and has a similar pronunciation.

Conjuncts of റ
As is common in Indic scripts, Malayalam joins letters together to form conjunct consonant clusters. There are several ways in which conjuncts are formed in Malayalam texts: using a post-base form of a trailing consonant placed under the initial consonant of a conjunct, a combined ligature of two or more consonants joined together, a conjoining form that appears as a combining mark on the rest of the conjunct, the use of an explicit candrakkala mark to suppress the inherent "a" vowel, or a special consonant form called a "chillu" letter, representing a bare consonant without the inherent "a" vowel. Texts written with the modern reformed Malayalam orthography, put̪iya lipi, may favor more regular conjunct forms than older texts in paḻaya lipi, due to changes undertaken in the 1970s by the Government of Kerala.
 ന് (n) +  റ (ṟa)  gives the ligature nṟa:

 റ് (ṟ) +  റ (ṟa)  gives the ligature ṟṟa:

Canadian Aboriginal Syllabics Re

ᕂ, ᕆ, ᕈ and ᕋ are the base characters "Re", "Ri", "Ro" and "Ra" in the Canadian Aboriginal Syllabics. The bare consonant ᕐ (R) is a small version of the A-series letter ᕋ, although the Western Cree letter ᕑ, derived from Pitman shorthand was the original bare consonant symbol for R. The character ᕂ is derived from a handwritten form of the Devanagari letter र, without the headline or vertical stem, and the forms for different vowels are derived by mirroring and rotation.
Unlike most writing systems without legacy computer encodings, complex Canadian syllabic letters are represented in Unicode with pre-composed characters, rather than with base characters and diacritical marks.

Odia Ra

Ra (ର) is a consonant of the Odia abugida. It ultimately arose from the Brahmi letter , via the Siddhaṃ letter  Ra. Like in other Indic scripts, Odia consonants have the inherent vowel "a", and take one of several modifying vowel signs to represent syllables with another vowel or no vowel at all.

Conjuncts of ର

s is common in Indic scripts, Odia joins letters together to form conjunct consonant clusters. The most common conjunct formation is achieved by using a small subjoined form of trailing consonants. Most consonants' subjoined forms are identical to the full form, just reduced in size, although a few drop the curved headline or have a subjoined form not directly related to the full form of the consonant. The subjoined form of Ra is one of these mismatched forms, and is referred to as "Ra Phala". In addition, an initial Ra is indicated with a special form called "Repha". The Repha and Ra-Phala forms are the only way conjuncts with Ra are made.

Odia Repha
 ର୍ (r) +  କ (ka)  gives the ligature rka:

 ର୍ (r) +  ଖ (kha)  gives the ligature rkha:

 ର୍ (r) +  ଗ (ga)  gives the ligature rga:

 ର୍ (r) +  ଘ (ɡʱa)  gives the ligature rɡʱa:

 ର୍ (r) +  ଙ (ŋa)  gives the ligature rŋa:

 ର୍ (r) +  ର (ra)  gives the ligature rra:

Odia Ra Phala
 କ୍ (k) +  ର (ra)  gives the ligature kra:

 ଖ୍ (kh) +  ର (ra)  gives the ligature khra:

 ଗ୍ (g) +  ର (ra)  gives the ligature gra:

 ଘ୍ (ɡʱ) +  ର (ra)  gives the ligature ɡʱra:

 ଙ୍ (ŋ) +  ର (ra)  gives the ligature ŋra:

 ଲ୍ (l) +  ର (ra)  gives the ligature lra:

Comparison of Ra
The various Indic scripts are generally related to each other through adaptation and borrowing, and as such the glyphs for cognate letters, including Ra, are related as well.

Character encodings of Ra
Most Indic scripts are encoded in the Unicode Standard, and as such the letter Ra in those scripts can be represented in plain text with unique codepoint. Ra from several modern-use scripts can also be found in legacy encodings, such as ISCII.

References

 Conjuncts are identified by IAST transliteration, except aspirated consonants are indicated with a superscript "h" to distinguish from an unaspirated cononant + Ha, and the use of the IPA "ŋ" and "ʃ" instead of the less dinstinctive "ṅ" and "ś".

Indic letters